Charlie West (born  August 31, 1946, in Big Spring, Texas) is a former safety who played for three National Football League teams. He played in Super Bowl IV as a member of the Minnesota Vikings. He also still holds the University of Texas El Paso career record of 19 interceptions, including a school record four in one game. Today, he presently lives near New York City and coaches the Carmel High School football team in New York, serving as the defensive coordinator.
West returned kicks and punts for the Minnesota Vikings, and still holds the team's record for longest punt return.  On November 3, 1968, playing the Washington Redskins, West returned a Mike Bragg punt 98 yards for a touchdown.

References

UTEP vs. NMSU rivalry: Players on both sides hold fast to vivid memories

1946 births
Living people
People from Big Spring, Texas
American football defensive backs
UTEP Miners football players
Minnesota Vikings players
Detroit Lions players
Denver Broncos players
New England Patriots coaches